Insurance fraud is any act committed to defraud an insurance process. It occurs when a claimant attempts to obtain some benefit or advantage they are not entitled to, or when an insurer knowingly denies some benefit that is due. According to the United States Federal Bureau of Investigation, the most common schemes include premium diversion, fee churning, asset diversion, and workers compensation fraud. Perpetrators in the schemes can be insurance company employees or claimants. False insurance claims are insurance claims filed with the fraudulent intention towards an insurance provider.

Insurance fraud has existed since the beginning of insurance as a commercial enterprise. Fraudulent claims account for a significant portion of all claims received by insurers, and cost billions of dollars annually. Types of insurance fraud are diverse and occur in all areas of insurance.  Insurance crimes also range in severity, from slightly exaggerating claims to deliberately causing accidents or damage.  Fraudulent activities affect the lives of innocent people, both directly through accidental or intentional injury or damage, and indirectly by the crimes leading to higher insurance premiums. Insurance fraud poses a significant problem, and governments and other organizations try to deter such activity.

An epigram by the Roman poet Martial provides a clear evidence the phenomenon of insurance fraud was already known in the Roman Empire during the First Century AD:

 "Tongilianus, you paid two hundred for your house;
 An accident too common in this city destroyed it.
 You collected ten times more. Doesn't it seem, I pray,
 That you set fire to your own house, Tongilianus?" Book III, No. 52

Causes

The "chief motive in all insurance crimes is financial profit". Insurance contracts provide both the insured and the insurer with opportunities for exploitation.

According to the Coalition Against Insurance Fraud, the causes vary, but are usually centered on greed, and on holes in the protections against fraud. Often, those who commit insurance fraud view it as a low-risk, lucrative enterprise. For example, drug dealers who have entered insurance fraud  think it's safer and more profitable than working street corners. Compared to those for other crimes, court sentences for insurance fraud can be lenient, reducing the risk of extended punishment. Though insurers fight fraud, some pay suspicious claims anyway, as settling such claims is often cheaper than legal action

Another basis for fraud is over-insurance, in which someone insures property for more than its real value. This condition can be difficult to avoid, especially since an insurance provider might sometimes encourage it to obtain greater profits. This lets fraudsters profit by destroying their property, because they receive an insurance payout greater that the value of the property.  The most common forms of insurance fraud are re-framing a non-insured damage to make it an event covered by insurance, and inflating the value of the loss.

Losses due to insurance fraud

It is hard to place an exact value on the money stolen through insurance fraud. Insurance fraud is deliberately undetectable, unlike visible crimes such as robbery or murder. As such, the number of cases of insurance fraud that are detected is much lower than the number of acts that are actually committed.  The best that can be done is to provide an estimate for the losses that insurers suffer due to insurance fraud.  The Coalition Against Insurance Fraud estimates that in 2006 a total of about $80 billion was lost in the United States due to insurance fraud.  According to estimates by the Insurance Information Institute, insurance fraud accounts for about 10 percent of the property/casualty insurance industry's incurred losses and loss adjustment expenses.  The National Health Care Anti-Fraud Association estimates that 3% of the health care industry's expenditures in the United States are due to fraudulent activities, amounting to a cost of about $51 billion.  Other estimates attribute as much as 10% of the total healthcare spending in the United States to fraud—about $115 billion annually. According to the FBI, non-health insurance fraud costs an estimated $40 billion per year, which increases the premiums for the average U.S. family between $400 and $700 annually. Another study of all types of fraud committed in the United States insurance institutions (property-and-casualty, business liability, healthcare, social security, etc.) put the true cost at 33% to 38% of the total cash flow through the system. This study resulted in the book title The Trillion Dollar Insurance Crook by J.E. Smith. In the United Kingdom, the Insurance Fraud Bureau estimates that the loss due to insurance fraud in the United Kingdom is about £1.5 billion ($3.08 billion), causing a 5% increase in insurance premiums.  The Insurance Bureau of Canada estimates that personal injury fraud in Canada costs about C$500 million annually.
Indiaforensic Center of Studies estimates that Insurance frauds in India costs about $6.25 billion annually.

Hard vs. soft fraud

Insurance fraud can be classified as either hard fraud or soft fraud.

Hard fraud occurs when someone deliberately plans or invents a loss, such as a collision, auto theft, or fire that is covered by their insurance policy in order to claim payment for damages. Criminal rings are sometimes involved in hard fraud schemes that can steal millions of dollars.

Soft fraud, which is far more common than hard fraud, is sometimes also referred to as opportunistic fraud. This type of fraud consists of policyholders exaggerating otherwise legitimate claims. For example, when involved in an automotive collision an insured person might claim more damage than actually occurred. Soft fraud can also occur when, while obtaining a new health insurance policy, an individual misreports previous or existing conditions to obtain a lower premium on the insurance policy.

Types of insurance fraud

Life insurance

The majority of life insurance fraud occurs at the application stage, involving applicants misrepresenting their health, their income, and other personal information in order to get a cheaper premium. As more and more insurance amendments can be performed online or over the telephone, identity theft has become an enabling crime that can lead to the amendment of life insurance terms to benefit a fraudster; for example, by adding a second stolen identity as a new beneficiary.

Life insurance fraud may involve faking death to claim life insurance. Fraudsters may sometimes turn up a few years after disappearing, claiming a loss of memory.

An example of life insurance fraud occurred in the case of John Darwin, a former teacher and prison officer who turned up alive in December 2007, five years after he was thought to have died in a canoeing accident, claiming to have no memory of the period after his disappearance.

Similarly, former British Government minister John Stonehouse went missing in 1974 from a beach in Miami but was discovered living under an assumed name in Australia. He was subsequently extradited to Britain and imprisoned for seven years on charges of fraud, theft, and forgery.

Health care insurance

Health insurance fraud is described as an intentional act of deceiving, concealing, or misrepresenting information that results in health care benefits being paid to an individual or group.

Fraud can be committed either by an insured person or by a provider. Member fraud consists of claims on behalf of ineligible members and/or dependents, alterations on enrollment forms, concealing pre-existing conditions, failure to report other coverage, prescription drug fraud, and failure to disclose claims that were a result of a work-related injury.

Provider fraud consists of claims submitted by bogus physicians, billing for services not rendered, billing for higher level of services, diagnosis or treatments that are outside the scope of practice, alterations on claims submissions, and providing services while medical licenses are either suspended or revoked. Independent medical examinations debunk false insurance claims and allow the insurance company or claimant to seek a non-partial medical view for injury-related cases.

According to the Coalition Against Insurance Fraud, health insurance fraud depletes taxpayer-funded programs like Medicare, and may victimize patients in the hands of certain doctors.  Some scams involve double-billing by doctors who charge insurers for treatments that never occurred, and surgeons who perform unnecessary surgery.

According to Roger Feldman, Blue Cross Professor of Health Insurance at the University of Minnesota, one of the main reasons that medical fraud is such a prevalent practice is that nearly all of the parties involved find it favorable in some way.  Many physicians see it as necessary to provide quality care for their patients.  Many patients, although disapproving of the idea of fraud, are sometimes more willing to accept it when it affects their own medical care.  Program administrators are often lenient on the issue of insurance fraud, as they want to maximize the services of their providers.

The most common perpetrators of healthcare insurance fraud are health care providers.  One reason for this, according to David Hyman, a Professor at the University of Maryland School of Law, is that the historically-prevailing attitude in the medical profession is one of "fidelity to patients".  This incentive can lead to fraudulent practices such as billing insurers for treatments that are not covered by the patient's insurance policy.  To do this, physicians bill for a different service that the policy covers, rather than the service they rendered.

Another motivation for insurance fraud is a desire for financial gain.  Public healthcare programs such as Medicare and Medicaid are especially conducive to fraudulent activities, as they are often run on a fee-for-service structure.  Physicians use several fraudulent techniques to achieve this end.  These can include "up-coding" or "upgrading", which involve billing for more expensive treatments than those actually provided; providing, and subsequently billing for, treatments that are not medically necessary; scheduling extra visits for patients; referring patients to other physicians when no further treatment is actually necessary; "phantom billing", billing for services not rendered; and "ganging", billing for services to family members or other individuals who are accompanying the patient but who did not personally receive any services.

Perhaps the greatest total dollar amount of fraud is committed by the health insurance companies themselves. There are numerous studies and articles detailing examples of insurance companies intentionally not paying claims and deleting them from their systems, denying and cancelling coverage, and the blatant underpayment to hospitals and physicians beneath what are normal fees for care they provide. Although difficult to obtain the information, this fraud by insurance companies can be estimated by comparing revenues from premium payments and expenditures on health claims.

In response to the increased amount of health care fraud in the United States, Congress, through the Health Insurance Portability and Accountability Act of 1996 (HIPAA), has specifically established health care fraud as a federal criminal offense with punishment of up to ten years of prison in addition to significant financial penalties.

Automobile insurance

Fraud rings or groups may fake traffic deaths or stage collisions to make false insurance or exaggerated claims and collect insurance money. The ring may involve insurance claims adjusters and other people who create phony police reports to process claims.

The Insurance Fraud Bureau in the UK estimated there were more than 20,000 staged collisions and false insurance claims across the UK from 1999 to 2006. One tactic fraudsters use is to drive to a busy junction or roundabout and brake sharply causing a motorist to drive into the back of them. They claim the other motorist was at fault because they were driving too fast or too close behind them, and make a false and inflated claim to the motorist's insurer for whiplash and damage, which can pay the fraudsters up to £30,000. In the Insurance Fraud Bureau's first year or operation, the usage of data mining initiatives exposed insurance fraud networks and led to 74 arrests and a five-to-one return on investment.

The Insurance Research Council estimated that in 1996, 21 to 36 percent of auto-insurance claims contained elements of suspected fraud.  There is a wide variety of schemes used to defraud automobile insurance providers.  These ploys can differ greatly in complexity and severity. Richard A. Derrig, vice president of research for the Insurance Fraud Bureau of Massachusetts, lists several ways that auto-insurance fraud can occur, such as:

Staged collisions

In staged collision fraud, fraudsters use a motor vehicle to stage an accident with the innocent party.  Typically, the fraudsters' vehicle carries four or five passengers.  Its driver makes an unexpected manoeuvre, forcing an innocent party to collide with the fraudster's vehicle. Each of the fraudsters then files claims for injuries sustained in the vehicle.  A "recruited" doctor diagnoses whiplash or other soft-tissue injuries that are hard to dispute later.

Other examples include jumping in front of cars as done in Russia. The driving conditions and roads are dangerous with many people trying to scam drivers by jumping in front of expensive-looking cars or crashing into them. Hit and runs are very common and insurance companies notoriously specialize in denying claims. Two-way insurance coverage is very expensive and almost completely unavailable for vehicles over ten years old–the drivers can only obtain basic liability. Because Russian courts do not like using verbal claims, most people have dashboard cameras installed to warn would-be perpetrators or provide evidence for/against claims.

Exaggerated claims

A real accident may occur, but the dishonest owner may take the opportunity to incorporate a whole range of previous minor damage to the vehicle into the garage bill associated with the real accident. Personal injuries may also be exaggerated, particularly whiplash. Insurance fraud cases of exaggerated claims can also include claiming damage to the car that is not from the accident reported in the claim.

Examples

Examples of soft auto-insurance fraud include filing more than one claim for a single injury, filing claims for injuries not related to an automobile accident, misreporting wage losses due to injuries, and reporting higher costs for car repairs than those that were actually paid. Hard auto-insurance fraud can include activities such as staging automobile collisions, filing claims when the claimant was not actually involved in the accident, submitting claims for medical treatments that were not received, or inventing injuries.  Hard fraud can also occur when claimants falsely report their vehicle as stolen.  Soft fraud accounts for the majority of fraudulent auto-insurance claims.

Another example is that a person may illegally register their car to a location that would net them cheaper insurance rates than where they actually live, sometimes called rate evasion. For example, some drivers in Brooklyn have Pennsylvania license plates, because insurance rates for a car registered to an address in rural Pennsylvania are much less than they are in Brooklyn. Another form of automobile insurance fraud, known as "fronting", involves registering someone other than the real primary driver of a car as the primary driver of the car. For example, parents might list themselves as the primary driver of their children's vehicles to avoid young driver premiums.

"Crash for cash" scams may involve random unaware strangers, set to appear as the perpetrators of the orchestrated crashes. Such techniques are the classic rear-end shunt (the driver in front suddenly slams on the brakes, possibly with brake lights disabled), the decoy rear-end shunt (when following one car, another one pulls in front of it, causing it to brake sharply, then the first car drives off) or the helpful wave shunt (the driver is waved into a line of queuing traffic by the scammer who promptly crashes, then denies waving).

Organized crime rings can also be involved in auto-insurance fraud, sometimes carrying out schemes that are very complex. An example of one such ploy is given by Ken Dornstein, author of Accidentally, on Purpose: The Making of a Personal Injury Underworld in America. In this scheme, known as a "swoop-and-squat", one or more drivers in "swoop" cars force an unsuspecting driver into position behind a "squat" car. This squat car, which is usually filled with several passengers, then slows abruptly, forcing the driver of the chosen car to collide with the squat car.  The passengers in the squat car then file a claim with the other driver's insurance company.  This claim often includes bills for medical treatments that were not necessary or not received.

An incident that took place on Golden State Freeway June 17, 1992, brought public attention to the existence of organized crime rings that stage auto accidents for insurance fraud. These schemes generally consist of three different levels. At the top, there are the professionals—doctors or lawyers who diagnose false injuries and/or file fraudulent claims and these earn the bulk of the profits from the fraud. Next are the "cappers" or "runners", the middlemen who obtain the cars to crash, farm out the claims to the professionals at the top, and recruit participants. These participants at the bottom-rung of the scheme are desperate people (poor immigrants or others in need of quick cash) who are paid around US$1000 to place their bodies in the paths of cars and trucks, playing a kind of Russian roulette with their lives and those of unsuspecting motorists around them. According to investigators, cappers usually hire within their own ethnic groups. What makes busting these staged-accident crime rings difficult is how quickly they move into jurisdictions with lesser enforcement, after a crackdown in a particular region. As a result, in the US several levels of police and the insurance industry have cooperated in forming task forces and sharing databases to track claim histories.

In the United Kingdom, there is an increasing incidence of false whiplash claims to car insurance companies from motorists involved in minor car accidents (for instance; a shunt). Because the mechanism of injury is not fully understood, A&E doctors have to rely on a patient's external symptoms (which are easy to fake). Resultingly, "no win no fee" personal injury solicitors exploit this "loophole" for easy compensation money (often a £2500 payout). Ultimately this has resulted in increased motor insurance premiums, which has had the knock-on effect of pricing younger drivers off the road.

Property insurance

Possible motivations for this can include obtaining payment that is worth more than the value of the property destroyed, or to destroy and subsequently receive payment for goods that could not otherwise be sold.  According to Alfred Manes, the majority of property insurance crimes involve arson. One reason for this is that any evidence that a fire was started by arson is often destroyed by the fire itself.  According to the United States Fire Administration, in the United States there were approximately 31,000 fires caused by arson in 2006, resulting in losses of $755 million.

Unemployment insurance 
Unemployment insurance fraud can occur when someone who is not unemployed or who steals the identity of another individual obtains unemployment benefits to which he or she is not entitled. During 2020, there was a significant spike of unemployment fraud in the United States.

Premium fraud 
In addition to fraudulent claims, insurers can lose premium because customers inaccurately describe the risk, causing less premium to be charged. This can happen for any type of insurable risk and is most noteworthy in workers compensation insurance, where insureds report fewer employees, less payroll, and less risky employees than is actually intended to be covered by the policy.

Council compensation claims

The fraud involving claims from the councils' insurers suppose staging damages blamable on the local authorities (mostly falls and trips on council owned land) or inflating the value of existing damages.

Detecting insurance fraud

The detection of insurance fraud generally occurs in two steps.  The first step is to identify suspicious claims that have a higher possibility of being fraudulent.  This can be done by computerized statistical analysis or by referrals from claims adjusters or insurance agents.  Additionally, the public can provide tips to insurance companies, law enforcement and other organizations regarding suspected, observed, or admitted insurance fraud perpetrated by other individuals. Regardless of the source, the next step is to refer these claims to investigators for further analysis.

Due to the sheer number of claims submitted each day, it would be far too expensive for insurance companies to have employees check each claim for symptoms of fraud.  Instead, many companies use computers and statistical analysis to identify suspicious claims for further investigation.  There are two main types of statistical analysis tools used: supervised and unsupervised.  In both cases, suspicious claims are identified by comparing data about the claim to expected values.  The main difference between the two methods is how the expected values are derived.

In a supervised method, expected values are obtained by analyzing records of both fraudulent and non-fraudulent claims.  According to Richard J. Bolton and David B. Hand, both of Imperial College in London, this method has some drawbacks as it requires absolute certainty that those claims analyzed are actually either fraudulent or non-fraudulent, and because it can only be used to detect types of fraud that have been committed and identified before.

Unsupervised methods of statistical detection, on the other hand, involve detecting claims that are abnormal.  Both claims adjusters and computers can also be trained to identify "red flags", or symptoms that in the past have often been associated with fraudulent claims.  Statistical detection does not prove that claims are fraudulent; it merely identifies suspicious claims that must be investigated further.

Fraudulent claims can be one of two types:
 they can be otherwise legitimate claims that are exaggerated or "built up", or
 they can be false claims in which the damages claimed never actually occurred.
Once a built up claim is identified, insurance companies usually try to negotiate the claim down to the appropriate amount.  Suspicious claims can also be submitted to "special investigative units", or SIUs, for further investigation.  These units generally consist of experienced claims adjusters with special training in investigating fraudulent claims.  These investigators look for certain symptoms associated with fraudulent claims, or otherwise look for evidence of falsification of some kind.  This evidence can then be used to deny payment of the claims or to prosecute fraudsters if the violation is serious enough.

When an insurance company's fraud department investigates a fraud claim, they frequently proceed in two stages: pre-contact and post-contact. In the pre-contact stage they analyze all available evidence before they contact the suspect.  They may review submitted paperwork, reach out to third parties, and gather evidence from available sources. Then, in the "post-contact" stage, they interview the suspect to gather more information and, ideally, obtain an incriminating statement. Insurance fraud investigators are trained to question the suspect in a way that precludes the suspect raising a valid defense at a later time. For example, questions about access to claim forms preclude the defense of another individual filling out the fraudulent documents. Common defenses that the suspect interview may preclude include the suspect lacking either the knowledge that their statement was false or the intention to defraud, or the suspect making an ambiguous statement that was later misinterpreted. Full disclosure may add credibility to a suspect's account of events, but omissions from disclosure or false statements may detract from the suspect's credibility in later interviews or proceedings.

Within the context of health insurance, fraud by health insurance companies is sometimes found by comparing revenues from premiums paid against the expenditure by the health insurance companies on claims. For example, in 2006 the Harris County Medical Society, in Texas, had a health insurance rate increase of 22 percent for "consumer-driven" health plans from Blue Cross and Blue Shield of Texas. This was despite the fact that during the previous year, Blue Cross had paid out only 9 percent of the collected premium dollars for claims.

Legislation

National and local governments, especially in the last half of the twentieth century, have recognized insurance fraud as a serious crime, and have made efforts to punish and prevent this practice.  Some major developments are listed below:

United States

Insurance Fraud is specifically classified as a crime in all states, though a minority of states only criminalize certain types (e.g. Oregon only outlaws Worker Compensation and Property Claim fraud).
The Coalition Against Insurance Fraud was founded in 1993 to help fight insurance fraud. This organization collects information on insurance fraud, and is the only anti-fraud alliance speaking for consumers, insurance companies, government agencies and others. Through its unique work, the Coalition empowers consumers to fight back, helps fraud fighters better detect this crime and deters more people from committing fraud. The Coalition supports this mission with a large and continually expanding armory of practical tools: Information, research & data, services and insight as a leading voice of the anti-fraud community.
Approximately one third of these investigations result in criminal conviction, one third result in denial of the claim, and one third result in payment of the claim.[48]
19 states require mandatory insurer fraud plans.  This requires companies to form programs to combat fraud and in some cases to develop investigation units to detect fraud.
41 states have fraud bureaus.  These are law enforcement agencies where "investigators review fraud reports and begin the prosecution process."
Section 1347 of Title 18 of the United States Code states that whoever attempts or carries out a "scheme or artifice" to "defraud a health care benefit program" will be "fined under this title or imprisoned not more than 10 years, or both."  If this scheme results in bodily injury, the violator may be imprisoned up to 20 years, and if the scheme results in death the violator may be imprisoned for life.

Besides making laws more severe, Legislation has also come up with a list for management that should be implemented so that companies are better suited to combat the possibility of being scammed. That list includes:

Understanding that fraud does exist and that there is a high possibility for it happening.
Being fully aware of the dangers and severity of the problem.
Understanding the importance of the hiring process and how important it is to hire honest individuals.
Learn to deal with the economic side of business. That means putting procedures and policies in place to catch and deal with individuals trying to commit fraud.

Canada

The Insurance Crime Prevention Bureau was founded in 1973 to help fight insurance fraud.  This organization collects information on insurance fraud, and also carries out investigations.  Approximately one third of these investigations result in criminal conviction, one third result in denial of the claim, and one third result in payment of the claim.
British Columbia's Traffic Safety Statutes Amendment Act of 1997 states that any person who submits a motor vehicle insurance claim that contains false or misleading information may on the first offence be fined C$25,000, imprisoned for two years, or both.  On the second offense, that person may be fined C$50,000, imprisoned for two years, or both.

United Kingdom
A major portion of the Financial Services Act 1986 was intended to help prevent fraud.
The Serious Fraud Office, set up under the Criminal Justice Act 1987, was established to "improve the investigation and prosecution of serious and complex fraud."
The Fraud Act 2006 specifically defines fraud as a crime.  This act defines fraud as being committed when a person "makes a false representation", "fails to disclose to another person information which he is under a legal duty to disclose", or abuses a position in which a person is "expected to safeguard, or not to act against, the financial interests of another person".  This act also defines the penalties for fraud as imprisonment up to ten years, a fine, or both.
A task force that specializes in tracking criminals who knowingly commit fraud.

See also
Federal Bureau of Investigation
Florida Division of Insurance Fraud
Horse murders
Split billing
United States Postal Inspection Service
Anti-fraud

References

External links
Insurance Information Institute. Insurance Information Institute.
Coalition Against Insurance Fraud. Coalition Against Insurance Fraud.
National Health Care Anti-Fraud Association
National Insurance Crime Bureau. National Insurance Crime Bureau.
Insurance Bureau of Canada
UK Insurance Fraud Bureau
Insurance Research Council
U.S. Fire Administration. United States Fire Administration.
2009 Florida report: Impacts of the Economy and Insurance Fraud
California: Department of Insurance; Fraud: What is Insurance Fraud?
UK Insurance Fraud Register

 
Crimes
Fraud
Insurance law
Property crimes
Organized crime activity